John Phillips (John, the Wolf King of L.A.) is the first solo recording by the Mamas & the Papas leader John Phillips. All songs were Phillips originals, dealing mostly with recent events in Phillips' life, including references to his new girlfriend Geneviève Waïte and longtime friend Ann Marshall ("April Anne"). The backing musicians included members of Wrecking Crew.  Today the album receives favorable reviews from fans and critics alike. The album was selected as one of ShortList's 55 Coolest Albums Ever.

As Phillips was the backing singer in the Mamas and the Papas, with the other three serving as lead singers, the album mix tends to de-emphasize his lead vocals. Denny Doherty stated that, had the Mamas & the Papas performed this album, it would have been one of their finest, because of the strength of Phillips' songs. The single "Mississippi" reached the US Billboard top 40.  Phillips and the other members of the Mamas & the Papas were threatened with a lawsuit just as the album was released, discouraging the label from promoting the album.

In 2006, the album was reissued by Varèse Sarabande with eight bonus tracks, also mostly Phillips originals.

Chart positions

Track listing
All songs written by John Phillips, except where noted.
"April Anne" – 3:22
"Topanga Canyon" – 3:53
"Malibu People" – 3:41
"Someone's Sleeping" – 2:46
"Drum" – 3:36
"Captain" – 3:25
"Let It Bleed, Genevieve" – 2:53
"Down the Beach" – 2:52
"Mississippi" – 3:36
"Holland Tunnel" – 3:41

2006 bonus tracks
"Shady" – 3:48
"Lonely Children" – 3:44
"Lady Genevieve" – 4:30
"Black Girl" (Traditional) – 3:29
"The Frenchman" – 4:03
"16mm Baby" (Matthew Reich) – 2:41
"Larry, Joe, Hal and Me" – 2:25
"Mississippi" [Single Version] – 3:07

Personnel
John Phillips – vocals, guitar, harmonica
Buddy Emmons – pedal steel
James Burton – guitar, dobro
Red Rhodes – steel guitar
Darlene Love – vocals
Fanita James – vocals
Jean King – vocals
Gordon Terry – fiddle, violin
Hal Blaine – drums
David Cohen – guitar
Dr. Eric Hord – guitar
Larry Knechtel – keyboards
Joe Osborn – bass
Technical
Chuck Britz – engineer
Tom Gundelfinger – photography

References

John Phillips (musician) albums
1970 debut albums
Albums produced by Lou Adler
Varèse Sarabande albums
Dunhill Records albums